Christianella is a genus in the Malpighiaceae, a family of about 75 genera of flowering plants in the order Malpighiales. Christianella comprises 5 species of woody vines and shrubby habit occurring in forests, roadside thickets, and shrubby savannas in southeastern Mexico, Central America, and South America.

External links and reference
Malpighiaceae Malpighiaceae - description, taxonomy, phylogeny, and nomenclature
Christianella
Anderson, W. R. 2006. Eight segregates from the neotropical genus Mascagnia (Malpighiaceae). Novon 16: 168–204.

Malpighiaceae
Malpighiaceae genera